Intervals is an album by American jazz pianist Ahmad Jamal featuring performances recorded in 1980 and released on the 20th Century Fox label.

Critical reception
Allmusic awarded the album 1½ stars stating "This very forgettable LP features Jamal on both electric and acoustic piano, saddled by rather commercial arrangements".

Track listing
All compositions by Ahmad Jamal except as indicated
 "You're Welcome, Stop On By" (Bobby Womack, Truman Thomas) – 5:51    
 "Jordie" – 3:52    
 "So In Love" (Cole Porter) – 3:40
 "Reggae" – 3:48    
 "Boatride" – 5:17    
 "Excerpt from My One and Only Love" (Guy Wood, Robert Mellin) – 2:10   
 "The Tube" – 4:15    
 "Bones" – 6:23

Personnel
Ahmad Jamal – piano
John Heard – Bass
Harvey Mason – Drums
Calvin Keys – Guitar
Selden Newton – Percussion

References 

20th Century Fox Records albums
Ahmad Jamal albums
1980 albums
Albums produced by Bones Howe